Night/Ext is a 2018 Egyptian drama film directed by Ahmad Abdalla. It was screened in the Contemporary World Cinema section at the 2018 Toronto International Film Festival. Sherif Desoky won the award for Best Actor at the 40th Cairo International Film Festival for his role in the film.

Cast
 Karim Kassem as Moe
 Mona Hala as Toto
 Sherief El Desouky as Mustafa
 Ahmad Magdy as Magdi

References

External links
 

2018 films
2018 drama films
Egyptian drama films
2010s Arabic-language films